Northwest Passage is a 1958-1959 26-episode half-hour adventure television series produced by Metro Goldwyn Mayer about Major Robert Rogers during the time of the French and Indian War (1756–1763).

The show derived its title and the main characters Rogers, Towne, and Marriner from the 1937 novel of the same name by Kenneth Roberts, and from the 1940 MGM feature film based on the novel.

The scope of the novel was much broader than that of the series, and the second half of the book included an historically based attempt by Rogers to find a water route through North America as a "passage" to the Pacific Ocean. This attempt, lending its name to the novel and used by Roberts as a metaphor for the questing human spirit, is referenced in the first episode.

References

External links 
 

1958 American television series debuts
1959 American television series endings
1950s American drama television series
Fiction set in the 1750s
Fiction set in the 1760s
Television series set in the 18th century
NBC original programming
American adventure television series
1950s Western (genre) television series
Television series by MGM Television
Television shows set in New York (state)
Works about the French and Indian War
Television series based on American novels